Solute carrier family 38 member 5 is a protein that in humans is encoded by the SLC38A5 gene.

Function

The protein encoded by this gene is a system N sodium-coupled amino acid transporter. The encoded protein transports glutamine, asparagine, histidine, serine, alanine, and glycine across the cell membrane, but does not transport charged amino acids, imino acids, or N-alkylated amino acids. Alternative splicing results in multiple transcript variants, but the full-length nature of some of these variants has not been determined.

References

Further reading